Pigna is a comune (municipality) in the Province of Imperia in the Italian region Liguria, located about  southwest of Genoa and about  west of Imperia, on the border with France.

The municipality of Pigna contains the frazione (subdivision) Buggio.

Pigna borders the following municipalities: Apricale, Castelvittorio, Isolabona, Rocchetta Nervina, Saorge (France), and Triora.

History 
In the southernmost district of North West Italy, where the mountains meet the sea, in a region called Liguria, can be found the valley Nervia. The valley moves up from the sea roughly north. and as it rises, you go on a journey through history, taking in the many villages dotted along the river as it runs down to the shore, one of the most important of which, not least for its historical past and a wealth of artistic treasures, is Pigna, named for the coniferous forests that once surrounded the village in abundance.

The ancient village clings to the slopes of the valley mimicking the shape of the pine cones that give it its name.

Archaeological remains, found in the Countryside surrounding Pigna, have unearthed Prehistoric evidence of human settlements in the area since about 60,000 years ago.

In fact, its current location and form is not original. In the 10th century the village was located closer to the valley floor around the church of San Tommaso but the position was too vulnerable and the politics surrounding the town too volatile, so the location father up the hill was chosen for a new settlement.

In the 13th century, before 1258, the village belonged to the nobility of the coastal town of Ventimiglia found at the mouth of the valley, but later in that year it yielded to the town Anjou of Provence. Soon after, the war between the Guelph's of Provence and Ghibellines of Genoa was raging in the valley, with Pigna on the side of the Guelph's (owing to its relationship with Provence) against the Doria of Dolceaqua (on the side of the Ghibelline's). In 1365 an historic peace was signed between the two factions at Pigna's Lago Pigo Bridge, next to Pigna's sulpha thermal springs, which became the dividing line between the territories of Provenza and the republic of Genoa.

With the surrender of Nice in 1388 (a peacefully negotiated territory transfer, artfully managed by the Grimaldi's of Monaco) Pigna passed from Provence's control to that of Savoy, which reignited tensions with the neighboring village of Castel Vittorio (an ally of Genoa). At times, this conflict would take on the characteristics of rivalries between brawling children. For example, in 1727 some residents of Pigna stole the bells from Castel Vittorio's bell tower, now kept in the 56 meters high the tower next to the church. Castel Vittorio retaliated by stealing the stones from Pigna's village square. For a brief period from 1625 to 1633 Pigna fell to the Genoese, but it was soon back under Savoy's control, and remained so until the establishment of the kingdom of Italy in 1860.

The older parts of the village are distinguished by the appearance of its almost haphazard construction, Its houses are built one on top of the other creating a network of tiny streets and alleyways, known as “Chibi”, forming a closely knit fortress that meanders about the village like an enormous accidental Labyrinth. The main streets are arranged in concentric semicircles, criss-crossed by the Chibi which are made up of narrow alley ways, steep paths, stairways, and shadowy side streets. These wind their way around the village ever up until you arrive at Piazza Colla Originally occupied by a small castle, now a village square. From where Local tradition is kept alive with the festival Della Poesia and the Commedia Intemelia, held the first week in August, where poetry and plays are performed in the local Intemelia dialect. This is the highest point of the old village from here there are panoramic views of the surrounding countryside and up the valley. Its slopes covered with chestnut and oak trees in the shadier parts and olive trees in the sun. The entire village is itself, in essence, a vast monument to the past; it has retained the basic structure of the original fortification. In fact the word Chibi Literally means dark and gloomy with the houses above covering the streets below, because of the need for protection not only from the constant threat of attack from other feudal fiefdoms, but also from the weather.

Much evidence of Pigna's medieval History can still be seen today, Represented by the numerous stone carvings, in the form of patterns designs and Latin monograms left in the walls of the Houses of the nobility, cut into the stone by the ruling families as a symbol of the privileged position granted to them under the feudal system.

If we go now to the Loggia Della Piazza Vecchia connected to the church of San Michelle, where units of measurement are carved in to the stone of the great dark columns, there is evidence of the villages ancient commercial past. It was here that medieval tradesmen would ply there wears, and to this day there is a market that spills out on to the Piazza XX Septembre, and it is From here that there are views up the valley to the next village of Castel Vittorio.

Underneath the Piazza there is a local Museum where the history of the village is explored through exhibits displaying the tools and artifacts of yesteryear. With examples of the traditional accouterments of the local industries.

The back wall of the Piazza XX Septembre is actually the outside wall of the parish church of San Michele Arcangelo; close to the oratory of San Antonio under which is the fountain of Canui mentioned in the 1575 municipal statutes. The church of San Michele Arcangelo itself was built in the 15th century with its majestic local stone façade, displaying a statue of Saint Michael dispatching the devil, carved with painstaking care and great skill by Giorgio De Lancia in 1450. It has a rose window depicting the Agnus Dei, or Lamb of God, surrounded by stained glass panels representing the 12 apostles. It's an early work by Giovanni Gaggini of Bissone, who went on to earn great fame for similar works in Genoa. A testimony to late medieval art its one of the last expressions of the Gothic style, on the threshold of the Renaissance. The interior is basilica shaped with three aisles separated by two rows of columns, the latest octagonal, as a result of the 16th century enlargement. Behind the altar is the grand polyptych created by the painter Giovanni Canavesio in January 1500, four meters high it includes 38 compartments framed with wood covered in gold these paintings attempt to capture the humble humanity of the story of Jesus, with an expressionism previously unknown in medieval art demonstrating the upcoming Renaissance style. They show Canavesios taste for theatrical and dramatic situations. Canavesio himself was born probably around 1430 in Pinerolo His name appears in the archives of his home town in 1450. When he came to Pigna, Canavesio was already an established painter. Prior to the creation of the polyptych in 1482 Canavesio produced a series of frescos for the church of San Bernardo. They represented the Four Evangelists, of the Church, the cycle of the Passion of Christ and the Last Judgment.

The original church of San Bernardo was built between the end of the 13th century and the early 14th century on a cliff above the Nervia valley. During the 15th century, a period of wealth for the village of Pigna and its 3,000 inhabitants, it was enlarged to its present form.

This was a strategic point for the house of Savoy and the war with Genoa. The location of Pigna and particularly this church was extremely important as it was on the road between the coastal areas and the lower valleys of the Piedmont. Dried fish and salt from the coast, along with oil and wine were transported to the north, while cheese and milk products or corn were sent in the other direction. The church of San Bernardo became not only a place of devotion but also a place of safety for travellers and merchants during the night, when the gates of Pigna were closed.

Today, Pigna is a tourist destination and the village is visited by people from all over the world. Quieter in the autumn and winter, in the spring and summer months the population swells as holiday makers come to enjoy its attractions, like the small mountain lakes dotted about the countryside or the festivals held in the village throughout the summer where locals and visitors eat food and dance late into the night.

Demographic evolution

Notable people
 Jean-Baptiste Pastor, property developer in Monaco, born in Pigna

See also
 Parco naturale regionale delle Alpi Liguri
 Liguria wine

References

Cities and towns in Liguria
Hilltowns in Liguria